Willy Røgeberg (1 December 1905 – 15 December 1969) was a Norwegian rifle shooter who competed before and after World War II. He won two Olympic medals. He won his first olympic medal in 50 m Rifle, prone at the 1936 Summer Olympics in Berlin. After the war he won a bronze medal at the 1948 Summer Olympics in London, this time in 300 m Rifle, Three positions. He also won several medals in the ISSF World Shooting Championships.

After his Olympic medal in 1936 he started his own guns and sporting equipment business in Oslo.

During the Second World War German occupation of Norway, Røgeberg was arrested by the Germans on 29 May 1942 on weapons related charges. He spent the period 29 May – 5 October 1942 incarcerated at Møllergata 19, then 5 October 1942 to 22 December 1943 as prisoner no. 4776 at Grini concentration camp.

References

External links
 All ISSF World Championships medalists 1897-2005

1905 births
1969 deaths
Norwegian male sport shooters
ISSF rifle shooters
Olympic gold medalists for Norway
Olympic bronze medalists for Norway
Olympic shooters of Norway
Shooters at the 1924 Summer Olympics
Shooters at the 1936 Summer Olympics
Shooters at the 1948 Summer Olympics
Olympic medalists in shooting
Grini concentration camp survivors
Medalists at the 1936 Summer Olympics
Medalists at the 1948 Summer Olympics
Sportspeople from Oslo
20th-century Norwegian people